Fenice may refer to:

Fenice, a font designed by Aldo Novarese (1977)
La Fenice, an Italian opera house in Venice, one of the most famous theatres in Europe

See also
 Phoenice, a town and Catholic titular bishopric in Greece, whose Italian name is Fenice